The Hang Dara Democratic Movement Party (HDMP) is a Cambodian political party whose leader was Hang Dara. It was created in May 2002.

Political ideologies
Here the HDMP believes in a variety of ideologies. With the right-wing it believes in protecting Cambodia's “National environment”, “sovereignty”, ”monarchy” and its “culture”. With its left-wing ideology it supports the improvement of people's livelihoods by constructing a newly improved healthcare system and educational sector with a huge priority on “building” more infrastructure in the Cambodian rural areas. Apart from that its liberal ideology is where the party will protect “human rights”, “democracy” and also free Cambodia from “tyrants” and “corrupt people”.

References

2002 establishments in Cambodia
Cambodian democracy movements
Conservative parties in Cambodia
Liberal parties in Cambodia
Political parties established in 2002
Political parties in Cambodia
Republican parties in Cambodia